Initiative 1639 was a Washington state ballot initiative concerning firearms regulation that was passed into law on November 6, 2018. The initiative altered the gun laws in Washington by defining the term "semiautomatic assault rifle" to include all semiautomatic rifles, raising the minimum age for purchasing semiautomatic rifles from 18 to 21. It also imposes a 10-day waiting period before being allowed to claim a rifle from a firearms dealer, and expanded background checks to include medical records requiring a waiver of HIPAA rights. (28)

Scope and impact
Initiative 1639 was passed into law by a vote of 59 percent to 41 percent in a public referendum that took place on November 6, 2018. The initiative concerned the regulation of firearms and made several amendments to state law: the minimum age of purchase of semiautomatic rifles was raised from 18 to 21, the extent of mandatory background checks for semiautomatic weapons purchasers was expanded, and requirements for home storage of firearms were established. The restrictions created by the legislation did not extend to single-shot or bolt-action rifles and the new regulations generally mirrored those already in place for handguns. According to The Seattle Times it was the most "ambitious" gun control legislation in the history of the state.

The increased age limit for "semiautomatic assault firearm" purchases went into effect on January 1, 2019, but the provision defining such firearms did not go into effect until July 1, 2019, along with other provisions of the law.

Campaign
The petition drive to place the initiative on the 2018 general election ballot raised $5.3 million, with funding coming from Microsoft co-founder Paul Allen, former Microsoft CEO Steve Ballmer, and others. The proposed initiative was also supported by state Attorney General Bob Ferguson, who had previously proposed a statewide ban on semi-automatic rifles in response to the 2016 Mukilteo shooting. The National Rifle Association and other groups opposed to the measure raised approximately $600,000 to campaign against it. Questions about whether the form of the petitions submitted by initiative backers complied with state law resulted in the measure being temporarily blocked from the ballot by order of the Thurston County Superior Court, though a subsequent ruling by the Washington State Supreme Court quashed the lower court injunction.

Results
Initiative Measure 1639 passed with 59.35% voting Yes and 40.65% voting No, with 1,839,475 Yes votes and 1,259,681 No votes, out of a total of  3,099,156 votes cast.

Legal challenges

Lawsuit
A lawsuit seeking to have the law overturned has been filed in federal court by the National Rifle Association and the Second Amendment Foundation. In August 2020, this challenge was dismissed in Federal court. As of August 31, 2020, this challenge has been handed over to the 9th Circuit Court of Appeals.

Enforcement refusals

Background
The Revised Code of Washington establishes the state's 39 sheriffs as the "chief executive officer and conservator of the peace" of their respective counties and charges each to "keep and preserve the peace in their respective counties, and quiet and suppress all affrays, riots, unlawful assemblies and insurrections" and to "defend the county against those who ... endanger the public peace or safety".

In what has been described as an "atypical"  situation, a number of county sheriffs have gone on record stating they do not intend to apply the provisions of Initiative 1639 in their counties. Some sheriffs have said they believe Initiative 1639 violates Article I, Section 24 of the Constitution of Washington, which says:

Others have said the law is incongruous in that it would prohibit private ownership of semiautomatic firearms by 18-, 19-, and 20-year-old military veterans who were otherwise determined qualified to bear them by the United States Armed Forces as indicated by their military service. Still other sheriffs have said provisions of the legislation requiring certain measures of home security for privately owned firearms are either impossible to enforce in practice, or are a violation of the Fourth Amendment to the United States Constitution, which prohibits "unreasonable search".

On February 12, Washington Attorney General Bob Ferguson issued an open letter to law enforcement refusing to enforce the initiative. Ferguson wrote that Initiative 1639 should be presumed constitutional as "no court has ruled that this initiative is unconstitutional." Ferguson said if law enforcement refused to perform enhanced background checks on semiautomatic rifle purchases as required by the initiative, they could be held liable if a prohibited individual gets a gun and uses it in a crime. The sheriffs of Franklin and Lincoln counties said that the required background checks would be performed, despite their belief that the initiative is unconstitutional.

Disposition of sheriffs

As of February 2019, the sheriffs of 12 of Washington's 39 counties — specifically Adams, Benton, Ferry, Grant, Grays Harbor, Kittitas, Klickitat, Mason, Okanogan, Pacific, Stevens, and Yakima counties, representing 1.4 million people, or 19% of the state's 7.5 million population — said they will not enforce the law, though some have indicated they will only refuse to do so until the final adjudication of pending lawsuits against the legislation.

The sheriff of Spokane County said he will not enforce the law, but accused other sheriffs who similarly stated they would not enforce it of "grandstanding".

The sheriffs of Lewis and Wahkiakum counties said they will apply the law in cases where they are aware it was transgressed, but would not take any steps to actively seek out or investigate violators. After warnings from the State Attorney General, two sheriffs who had initially said they would not enforce it, of Franklin, and Lincoln counties, said they would perform the background checks required by the law.

The sheriff of Cowlitz County has said he is undecided about whether or not to apply the law in his county.

The sheriffs of 13 counties, with a total population of 4.8 million, or 64% of the state, specifically Asotin, Chelan, Clallam, Clark, Douglas, Island, Jefferson, King, Pierce, Thurston, Walla Walla, Whatcom, and Whitman counties, said they will enforce the law, though several said they personally opposed it.

Public reaction
In an editorial, The News Tribune denounced sheriffs who refused to apply the law as "agitators" and accused them of rebellion, writing that the sheriffs who said they would refuse to enforce the law were usurping the legislative and judicial role. In an editorial, the Walla Walla Union-Bulletin described Initiative 1639 as a "lousy" law but said the sheriffs of the state's counties should enforce it, a position also taken by the Moscow-Pullman Daily News.

In early February 2019, several pseudonymous Facebook posts threatened to assassinate sheriffs who refused to enforce the law, specifically naming Spokane County Sheriff Ozzie Knezovich. A representative of the Alliance for Gun Responsibility, which campaigned for the legislation, condemned the threats.

References

External links
 Washington Secretary of State Election Results I-1639 by County - DO NOT TRUST THE MAP DISPLAY!
Final text, Washington Secretary of State
Washington Initiative 1639, Changes to Gun Ownership and Purchase Requirements Measure (2018), Ballotpedia
 Washington RCW 9.41.094 Waiver of confidentiality.

2018 Washington (state) ballot measures
Government of Washington (state)